is a fantasy romantic comedy manga series written by Kenji Saitō and illustrated by Akinari Nao. It has been serialized in Fujimi Shobo's shōnen manga magazine Monthly Dragon Age since 2010 and collected in twenty-eight tankōbon volumes as of October 2022.

A light novel adaptation by Kenji Saitō with illustrations by Akinari Nao is being published by Kadokawa Shoten, and the first volume was released in November 2014. An anime television series adaptation by Seven Arcs Pictures aired on TV Tokyo from October to December 2014. An anime film adaptation titled Trinity Seven the Movie: The Eternal Library and the Alchemist Girl premiered in February 2017. A second film adaptation titled Trinity Seven: Heavens Library & Crimson Lord premiered in March 2019.

Plot

Arata Kasuga lived a normal life together with his cousin and childhood friend Hijiri Kasuga in a small town. However, everything changes on the day of the Black Sun, which caused the Breakdown Phenomenon which destroys the town where he lived and takes Hijiri away. As Hijiri starts disappearing, she hangs a grimoire around his neck, asking it to protect Kasuga. Shattered by losing Hijiri and all of his other friends and family, Arata asks for his world to be good again, which leads to the grimoire artificially reconstructing his normal life and making him forget both the destruction of the city and Hijiri's disappearance. Lilith Asami, a mage, is sent to investigate the ruins, and she finds the powerful spell in their stead. She makes Arata remember the actual events, and consequently the spell is broken, but not without the grimoire telling him that Hijiri is still alive. Arata decides that his only option is to become a mage himself so he could rescue Hijiri, and so he joins the Royal Biblia Academy, a secret school for mages that deals with magical issues around the world. There he is introduced to the Trinity Seven, seven powerful mages who are at the top of their respective fields (Lilith being one of them) and who will help him in his goal of becoming a powerful magician and learning the truth about Hijiri and the Black Sun. He soon finds out that one of the Trinity Seven, Arin, looks almost exactly like his missing cousin, although she shows a completely different personality.

Media

Manga

The series was serialized in Fujimi Shobo's shōnen manga magazine Monthly Dragon Age since 2010. The first complied volume was released on July 7, 2011.  On October 10, 2014, Yen Press announced at their New York Comic Con panel that they licensed Trinity Seven for release in North America, with the first volume releasing on May 19, 2015.

A spin-off manga written by Saito and illustrated by Sutarō Hanao, titled , launched in Dragon Age on November 9, 2015, and ended on December 9, 2016. Chako Abeno launched a second spin-off, titled , in Dragon Age on February 9, 2017.  The manga ended on June 9, 2018.

Light novel
On November 4, 2014, a spinoff light novel adaptation of Trinity Seven was announced. It was written by Kenji Saito and illustrated by Akinari Nao. The novel series covered the past of the main characters, and events not yet shown in the manga. The first novel was released on November 8, 2014, titled Trinity Seven The Novel: Night Episode and Lost Memory. The second novel, titled Trinity Seven The Novel: Eternity Library and Alchemic Girl, was released on December 29, 2014. The third novel, titled Trinity Seven The Novel: Holy Shrine Maiden and the Eighth Library, was released on January 9, 2018.

Anime
An anime television series adaptation by Seven Arcs Pictures aired on TV Tokyo from October 7 to December 23, 2014, and other channels on TVA, TVO and AT-X. The series is directed by Hiroshi Nishikiori and Hiroyuki Yoshino is in charge of series composition.  The series has been licensed by Sentai Filmworks in North America, while Madman Entertainment holds the license for Australia and Animatsu Entertainment in the United Kingdom.

OVA

Films
A film adaptation of the manga series was announced in the Monthly Dragon Age magazine's August 2016 issue in July 2016. The cast and staff from the anime series returned to reprise their roles in the film. The film, titled Trinity Seven the Movie: The Eternal Library and the Alchemist Girl, premiered on February 25, 2017.

On July 3, 2018, the official website of the manga announced that a second film adaptation is in production. The second film, titled , premiered on March 29, 2019. The cast and staff from the anime series returned to reprise their roles in the second film.

Reception
As of June 2017, the manga has over 3 million copies in print.

See also
 Saint Seiya: Meiō Iden – Dark Wing - Another manga series by the same author

References

External links
Official website  
Anime official website 
Official TV Tokyo website 

Anime series based on manga
Fujimi Shobo manga
Harem anime and manga
Kadokawa Dwango franchises
Romantic comedy anime and manga
School life in anime and manga
Sentai Filmworks
Seven Arcs
Shōnen manga
TV Tokyo original programming
Urban fantasy anime and manga
Yen Press titles
Video games developed in Japan